Various newspapers, organisations and individuals endorsed parties or individual candidates for the 2019 Australian Federal Election.

Endorsements for parties

Newspapers and magazines

National daily newspapers

Individuals

Liberal Party of Australia

Charles Bass, entrepreneur, business executive, co-founder of Aquila Resources
Mark Bouris AM, businessman, entrepreneur, and media personality
Paul Darrouzet, businessman
Rowan Dean, editor of the Spectator Australia, and Sky News Australia co-host of Outsiders
John Gandel AC, billionaire entrepreneur, property developer and philanthropist
Robert Gerard AO, businessman and former member of the Reserve Bank of Australia
John Howard OM AC SSI, 25th Prime Minister of Australia
Alan Jones AO, 2GB and Sky News Australia broadcaster
Jeff Kennett AC, 43rd Premier of Victoria, and President of the Hawthorn Football Club
Grant Lewis Kelley, Chief Executive and Director of Vicinity Centres
Harold Mitchell AC, entrepreneur, philanthropist and humanitarian
Alfred Moufarrige, CEO of Servcorp
Paul Murray, Sky News Australia broadcaster
Roslyn Packer AC, philanthropist and widow of billionaire media mogul Kerry Packer
Rita Panahi, Sky News Australia host of The Friday Show and opinion columnist
Andrew Peacock AC GCL, former Minister for Foreign Affairs, Minister for Defence, Australian Ambassador to the United States, and Leader and Deputy Leader of the Liberal Party
Allan Pidgeon, businessman, President of the National Flag Association (Qld), and Director of the Queensland Private Enterprise Centre
Mark Stockwell, olympic swimmer, and businessman
Harry Triguboff AO, billionaire real estate developer, and managing director of Meriton
Robert Webster, company director, grazier and former National Party of Australia NSW Member of Parliament
Paul Wheelton, businessman, founder of The Wheelton Group, and philanthropist
Geoff Wilson, founder of Wilson Asset Management

National Party of Australia

 Michael Crouch AC, industrialist, philanthropist and Chairman of Australian private company Midgeon Holdings

Australian Labor Party

Van Badham, writer and social commentator
Jimmy Barnes AO, rock singer, song writer and member of Cold Chisel
Peter Beattie AC, 36th Premier of Queensland, and Chair of the Australian Rugby League Commission
Mike Carlton AM, media commentator and author
Cate Blanchett AC, Actress and theatre director
Michael Caton, television, film and stage actor, comedian and television host
Blanche d'Alpuget, writer and widow of the 23rd Prime Minister of Australia Bob Hawke
Julia Gillard AC, 27th Prime Minister of Australia
Bob Hawke AC GCL, 23rd Prime Minister of Australia (deceased)
Bill Hayden AC, 21st Governor-General of Australia, and former leader of the Australian Labor Party
Paul Keating, 24th Prime Minister of Australia
Bill Kelty AC, former secretary of the Australian Council of Trade Unions (ACTU), member of the Reserve Bank of Australia, and commissioner of the Australian Football League
Fr. Bob Maguire AM RFD, Roman Catholic priest, community worker and media personality
Sally McManus, secretary of the Australian Council of Trade Unions (ACTU)
Molly Meldrum, music critic, journalist, record producer and musical entrepreneur
Annastacia Palaszczuk, Premier of Queensland
Kevin Rudd AC, 26th Prime Minister of Australia
Jordan Shanks, Youtuber and comedian

Australian Greens

Chilla Bulbeck, former emeritus professor of women's studies at Adelaide University
Graeme Wood, digital entrepreneur, philanthropist and environmentalist

Pauline Hanson's One Nation

United Australia Party

Australian Conservatives

Sam Kekovich, media personality, sports commentator, 'Australian Lambassador' and former Australian rules football player

Sustainable Australia

Dick Smith AC, entrepreneur, businessmen, aviator and philanthropist

Organisations

Liberal Party of Australia

Cartwheel Resources
Consolidated Travel Group
Evans Dixon Limited
KTQ Developments
Master Builders Association of Australia
Menzies Research Centre
Meriton
NIB Health Funds
Servcorp

National Party of Australia

Chalmers Legal Studio
Clubs Australia
Page Research Centre
Phillip Morris International - donated to both the National Party of Australia and the Liberal Democratic Party

Country Liberal Party 

 Michael Crouch AC, industrialist, philanthropist and Chairman of Australian private company Midgeon Holdings

Australian Labor Party

Australian Council of Trade Unions (ACTU)
Australian Education Union (AEU)
Australian Fabian Society
Australian Rail, Tram and Bus Industry Union (RTBU)
Australian Workers Union (AWU)
Chifley Research Centre
Construction, Forestry, Maritime, Mining and Energy Union (CFMMEU)
Electrical Trades Union of Australia (ETU) – donated to both the Australian Labor Party and the Australian Greens
Destroy The Joint, feminist movement
Maurice Blackburn (law firm)
United Voice
Victorian Trades Hall Council

Australian Greens

Electrical Trades Union of Australia (ETU) – donated to both the Australian Labor Party and the Australian Greens

Pauline Hanson's One Nation 

 Adani Group - donated to both Pauline Hanson's One Nation and the Liberal Party of Australia (A.C.T. Division)

Katter's Australian Party

Glencore
Sporting Shooters Association of Australia

Liberal Democratic Party 

 Phillip Morris International - donated to both the National Party of Australia and the Liberal Democratic Party

Shooters, Fishers and Farmers Party 

 NSW Amateur Pistol Association

Endorsements for individual candidates

New South Wales Electorates

Division of Banks
For Chris Gambian (Labor):

Charles Firth, comedian and member of The Chaser
Kevin Rudd AC, 26th Prime Minister of Australia

Division of Barton 
For Linda Burney (Labor):

EMILY's List Australia
Kevin Rudd AC, 26th Prime Minister of Australia

Division of Bennelong 
For John Alexander (Liberal):

 John Howard OM AC SSI, 25th Prime Minister of Australia

For Brian Owler (Labor):

 Kevin Rudd AC, 26th Prime Minister of Australia

Division of Cook 
For Scott Morrison (Liberal):

 Ben Fordham, 2GB presenter, and host of Australian Ninja Warrior
John Howard OM AC SSI, 25th Prime Minister of Australia
Alan Jones AO, 2GB and Sky News Australia broadcaster
 Jeff Kennett AC, 43rd Premier of Victoria, and President of the Hawthorn Football Club
 Paul Murray, Sky News Australia broadcaster

For Simon O'Brien (Labor):

 GetUp!

For Jon Doig (Greens):

 GetUp!

For Gaye Cameron (One Nation):

Mark Latham, state leader of One Nation in New South Wales, and former leader of the Australian Labor Party

Division of Cowper
For Pat Conaghan (National):

For Rob Oakeshott (Independent):

Mike Cannon-Brookes, billionaire co-founder and co-CEO of Atlassian
Russell Crowe, actor, producer, and musician
GetUp!
Margo Kingston, journalist, author, commentator

For Andrew Woodward (Labor):

 GetUp!

For Lauren Edwards (Greens):

 GetUp!

Division of Cunningham 
For Sharon Bird (Labor):

 EMILY's List Australia

Division of Farrer

For Kevin Mack (Independent):

Margo Kingston, journalist, author and commentator

Division of Gilmore
For Katrina Hodgkinson (Nationals):

Ann Sudmalis, former Liberal member for Gilmore (2013-2019) (Liberal)
Joanna Gash AM, former Mayor of the City of Shoalhaven, Liberal member for Gilmore (1996-2013) (Liberal)
John Sharp, former Minister for Transport and Regional Development, Member for Gilmore (1984-1993)

For Warren Mundine (Liberal):

John Howard OM AC SSI, 25th Prime Minister of Australia
Paul Murray, Sky News Australia broadcaster

For Fiona Phillips (Labor):

 EMILY's List Australia

Division of Hughes 
For Craig Kelly (Liberal):

For Diedree Steinwall (Labor):

 GetUp!

For Mitchell Shakespeare (Greens):

 GetUp!

Division of Hume

For Angus Taylor (Liberal):

For Aoife Champion (Labor):

 GetUp!

For David Powell (Greens):

 GetUp!

For Huw Kingston (Independent):

Mike Cannon-Brookes, billionaire co-founder and co-CEO of Atlassian
GetUp!
Margo Kingston, journalist, author and commentator

Division of Lindsay

For Melissa McIntosh (Liberal):

John Howard OM AC SSI, former Prime Minister of Australia and Leader of the Liberal Party of Australia

For Diane Beamer (Labor):

Division of Lyne

For Jeremy Miller (Independent):

Margo Kingston, journalist, author and commentator

Division of Mackellar

For Alice Thompson (Independent):

Mike Cannon-Brookes, billionaire co-founder and co-CEO of Atlassian
Margo Kingston, journalist, author and commentator

Division of Macquarie 
For Susan Templeman (Labor):

 EMILY's List Australia

For Sarah Richards (Liberal):

Division of Newcastle 
For Sharon Claydon (Labor):

 EMILY's List Australia

Division of New England

For Barnaby Joyce (Nationals):

For Adam Blakester (Independent):

Margo Kingston, journalist, author and commentator

Division of Parramatta 
For Julie Owens (Labor):

 EMILY's List Australia

Division of Reid 
For Fiona Martin (Liberal):

 John Howard OM AC SSI, 25th Prime Minister of Australia

For Sam Crosby (Labor):

 Kevin Rudd AC, 26th Prime Minister of Australia

Division of Robertson 
For Lucy Wicks (Liberal):

 John Howard OM AC SSI, 25th Prime Minister of Australia

For Anne Charlton (Labor):

EMILY's List Australia
GetUp!

For Cath Connor (Greens):

 GetUp!

Division of Sydney 
For Tanya Plibersek (Labor):

 EMILY's List Australia

Division of Warringah
For Tony Abbott (Liberal):

John Anderson AO, former Deputy Prime Minister of Australia, and former leader of the National Party
Mike Baird AO, 44th Premier of New South Wales
Gladys Berejiklian, Premier of New South Wales
Andrew Bolt, Herald Sun columnist, Sky News Australia and 2GB broadcaster
Roger Corbett AO, businessman and former CEO of Woolworths Limited
Christine Forster, councillor of the City of Sydney, and sister to Tony Abbott
John Howard OM AC SSI, 25th Prime Minister of Australia
Brett Lee, Australian cricketer, film actor and Fox Sports commentator
Greg Sheridan AO, foreign affairs journalist and conservative commentator

For Zali Steggall (Independent):

Layne Beachley AO , World Champion Surfer
Mike Cannon-Brookes, billionaire co-founder and co-CEO of Atlassian
Peter FitzSimons AM, journalist, radio and television presenter, author and chair of the Australian Republican Movement
Rickard Gardell, managing director and co-founder of Pacific Equity Partners
GetUp!
Margo Kingston, journalist, author and commentator
Guy Leech, former Ironman surf lifesaving champion
Kerryn Phelps AM, independent member for Wentworth, and former president of the Australian Medical Association

For Susan Moylan-Coombs (Independent)

 GetUp!

For Kristyn Glanville (Greens)

 GetUp!

For Dean Harris (Labor):

 GetUp!

Division of Wentworth
For Dave Sharma (Liberal):

Julie Bishop, former Minister for Foreign Affairs and Deputy Leader of the Liberal Party
Harries Carroll, Bondi Rescue lifeguard
David Gonski AC, businessman and chancellor of the University of New South Wales
John Howard OM AC SSI, 25th Prime Minister of Australia
Solomon Lew, businessman and chairman of Premier Investments
James Packer, billionaire businessman and investor
 Malcolm Turnbull, 29th Prime Minister of Australia

For Kerryn Phelps (Independent):

Darrin Barnett, Press Secretary to the 27th Prime Minister of Australia Julia Gillard
Mike Cannon-Brookes, billionaire co-founder and co-CEO of Atlassian
GetUp!
John Hewson AM, former Leader of the Liberal Party
Margo Kingston, journalist, author and commentator
Layne Beachley AO, World Champion Surfer

For Tim Murray (Labor):

Michael Caton, television, film and stage actor, comedian and television host
GetUp!
Graham Richardson AO, Sky News Australia host of Richo, political commentator, and former Minister for the Environment, Minister for Health, Minister for Transport and Communications, Minister for Social Security, and Senator for New South Wales
Alex Turnbull, fund manager and son of former Prime Minister Malcolm Turnbull

For Dominic Wy (Greens):

 GetUp!

Victorian Electorates

Division of Ballarat 
For Catherine King (Labor):

 EMILY's List Australia

Division of Bendigo 
For Lisa Chesters (Labor):

 EMILY's List Australia

Division of Chisholm

For Gladys Liu (Liberal):

For Jennifer Yang (Labor):

 Daniel Andrews, Premier of Victoria
EMILY's List Australia
Kevin Rudd AC, 26th Prime Minister of Australia

Division of Cooper 
For Ged Kearney (Labor):

EMILY's List Australia
Julia Gillard AC, 27th Prime Minister of Australia

Division of Corangamite 
For Sarah Henderson (Liberal)

 Geelong Advertiser

For Libby Coker (Labor)

EMILY's List Australia 
Victorian Trades Hall Council

For Damien Cole (Independent):

Layne Beachley, World Champion Surfer

Division of Corio 
For Richard Marles (Labor):

 Geelong Advertiser

Division of Deakin
For Michael Sukkar (Liberal):

 Advance Australia

For Shireen Morris (Labor):

Daniel Andrews, Premier of Victoria
Steve Bracks, 44th Premier of Victoria
EMILY's List Australia
Noel Pearson, Indigenous Australian lawyer and activist, and founder of the Cape York Institute
Kevin Rudd AC, 26th Prime Minister of Australia
Victorian Trades Hall Council

Division of Dunkley 
For Chris Crewther (Liberal):

For Peta Murphy (Labor)

 EMILY's List Australia

Division of Flinders

For Greg Hunt (Liberal):

 Advance Australia
 Alexander Downer AC, former Minister for Foreign Affairs, former leader of the Liberal Party and High Commissioner to the United Kingdom
Jeff Kennett AC, 43rd Premier of Victoria, and President of the Hawthorn Football Club

For Josh Sinclair (Labor):

GetUp!
Victorian Trades Hall Council

For Julia Banks (Independent):

Mike Cannon-Brookes, billionaire co-founder and co-CEO of Atlassian
GetUp!
Margo Kingston, journalist, author and commentator
Alex Turnbull, fund manager and son of former Prime Minister Malcolm Turnbull
Malcolm Turnbull, 29th Prime Minister of Australia

For Nathan Lesslie (Greens):

 GetUp!

Division of Gippsland 
For Darren Chester (National):

For Antoinette Holm (Labor):

 EMILY's List Australia

Division of Higgins 
For Katie Allen (Liberal):

 Jeff Kennett, 43rd Premier of Victoria and President of the Hawthorn Football Club

For Fiona McLeod (Labor):

Daniel Andrews, Premier of Victoria
EMILY's List Australia
Mary Gaudron QC, first female Justice of the High Court of Australia
Julia Gillard AC, 27th Prime Minister of Australia
Barry Jones, polymath, writer, teacher, lawyer, social activist, quiz champion, Minister for Science and Technology in the Hawke Government, and Australian Living Treasure
Bob Maguire, Roman Catholic priest, community worker and media personality
Maxine McKew, former Australian Broadcasting Corporation (ABC) journalist, and former Member for Bennelong
Gillian Triggs, Assistant Secretary-General of the United Nations, former President of the Australian Human Rights Commission and former Dean of the Sydney Law School

For Jason Ball (Greens):

 Julian Burnside, barrister and activist

Division of Indi

For Helen Haines (Independent):

Mike Cannon-Brookes, billionaire co-founder and co-CEO of Atlassian
Margo Kingston, journalist, author and commentator
Cathy McGowan, former Independent MP for Indi

Division of Jagajaga 
For Kate Thwaites (Labor):

 EMILY's List Australia

Division of Kooyong

For Josh Frydenberg (Liberal):

 Andrew Peacock AC GCL, former Minister for Foreign Affairs, Minister for Defence, Australian Ambassador to the United States, and Leader and Deputy Leader of the Liberal Party

For Julian Burnside (Greens):

GetUp!
Ian Macphee AO, Minister for Immigration and Ethnic Affairs in the Fraser Government
Gillian Triggs, Assistant Secretary-General of the United Nations, former President of the Australian Human Rights Commission and former Dean of the Sydney Law School

For Jana Stewart (Labor):

Daniel Andrews, Premier of Victoria
EMILY's List Australia
GetUp!

For Oliver Yates (Independent):

Mike Cannon-Brookes, billionaire co-founder and co-CEO of Atlassian
GetUp!
Margo Kingston, journalist, author and commentator

Division of Lalor 
For Joanne Ryan (Labor):

 EMILY's List Australia

Division of Macnamara
For Josh Burns (Labor):

 Julia Gillard AC, 27th Prime Minister of Australia
 Bob Maguire AM RFD, Roman Catholic priest, community worker and media personality

For Kate Ashmor (Liberal):

For Steph Hodgins-May (Greens):

 Gillian Triggs, Assistant Secretary-General of the United Nations, former President of the Australian Human Rights Commission and former Dean of the Sydney Law School

Division of Mallee

For Ray Kingston (Independent):

Mike Cannon-Brookes, billionaire founder and co-CEO of Atlassian
Margo Kingston, journalist, author and commentator

Division of Maribyrnong 
For Bill Shorten (Labor):

 Peter Beattie AC, 36th Premier of Queensland and Chairman of the Australian Rugby League Commission
Mike Carlton, media commentator and author
Julia Gillard AC, 27th Prime Minister of Australia
Bob Hawke AC GCL, 23rd Prime Minister of Australia (deceased)
 Bill Kelty AC, former secretary of the Australian Council of Trade Unions (ACTU), member of the Reserve Bank of Australia, and commissioner of the Australian Football League
Bob Maguire AM RFD, Roman Catholic priest, community worker and media personality

Division of Melbourne 
For Adam Bandt (Greens):

 Mike Cannon-Brookes, billionaire co-founder and co-CEO of Atlassian

Division of Menzies

For Kevin Andrews (Liberal):

For Stella Yee (Labor)

EMILY's List Australia
GetUp!
Kevin Rudd AC, 26th Prime Minister of Australia

For Robert Humphreys (Greens):

 GetUp!

Division of Monash 
For Jessica O'Donnell (Labor)

 EMILY's List Australia

Queensland Electorates

Division of Bonner 
For Ross Vasta (Liberal National):

For Jo Briskey (Labor):

 EMILY's List Australia

Division of Brisbane 
For Trevor Evans (Liberal National):

For Paul Newbury (Labor):

 Kevin Rudd AC, 26th Prime Minister of Australia

Division of Dawson 
For George Christensen (Liberal National):

For Belinda Hassan (Labor):

EMILY's List Australia
GetUp!

For Imogen Lindenberg (Greens):

 GetUp!

Division of Dickson 
For Peter Dutton (Liberal National):

Advance Australia
Janet Albrechtsen, chairman of the Institute of Public Affairs, opinion columnist for The Australian
Andrew Bolt, Sky News Australia host of The Bolt Report, 2GB presenter and Herald Sun columnist
John Howard OM AC SSI, 25th Prime Minister of Australia

For Ali France (Labor):

EMILY's List Australia
GetUp!
Paul Keating, 24th Prime Minister of Australia

For Benedict Coyne (Greens):

 GetUp!

Division of Fadden 
For Stuart Robert (Liberal National):

For Luz Stanton (Labor):

 EMILY's List Australia

Division of Griffith 
For Terri Butler (Labor):

 EMILY's List Australia

For Olivia Roberts (Liberal National):

For Max Chandler-Mather (Greens):

Division of Herbert 
For Cathy O'Toole (Labor):

 EMILY's List Australia

For Phillip Thompson (Liberal National):

Division of Leichhardt 
For Warren Entsch (Liberal National):

For Elida Faith (Labor):

 EMILY's List Australia

Division of Longman 
For Susan Lamb (Labor):

 EMILY's List Australia

For Terry Young (Liberal National):

Division of Maranoa 
For David Littleproud (Liberal National):

For Linda Little (Labor):

 EMILY's List Australia

Division of Moreton 
For Graham Perrett (Labor):

 Kevin Rudd, 26th Prime Minister of Australia

For Angela Owen (Liberal National):

Division of Petrie 
For Luke Howarth (Liberal National):

For Corinne Mulholland (Labor):

 EMILY's List Australia

Western Australian Electorates

Division of Brand 
For Madeleine King (Labor):

 EMILY's List Australia

Division of Canning 
For Andrew Hastie (Liberal):

 Advance Australia
 Master Builders Association of Western Australia

For Mellisa Teede (Labor):

EMILY's List Australia
GetUp!

For Jodie Moffat (Greens):

 GetUp!

Division of Curtin

For Celia Hammond (Liberal):

Julie Bishop, former Minister of Foreign Affairs, former Deputy Leader of the Liberal Party and former Minister for Education and Science
John Howard OM AC SSI, 25th Prime Minister of Australia

Division of Hasluck 
For Ken Wyatt (Liberal):

 John Howard OM AC SSI, 25th Prime Minister of Australia

Division of Moore 
For Ian Goodenough (Liberal):

 Master Builders Association of Western Australia

Division of Pearce 
For Christian Porter (Liberal):

Advance Australia
John Howard OM AC SSI, 25th Prime Minister of Australia
Master Builders Association of Western Australia

For Kim Travers (Labor)

EMILY's List Australia
GetUp!

For Eugene Marshall (Greens)

 GetUp!

Division of Swan 
For Steve Irons (Liberal):

 John Howard OM AC SSI, 25th Prime Minister of Australia

For Hannah Beazley (Labor):

EMILY's List Australia

Division of Tangney 
For Ben Morton (Liberal):

For Marion Boswell (Labor):

 EMILY's List Australia

South Australian Electorates

Division of Boothby
For Nicolle Flint (Liberal):

 Advance Australia
 Alexander Downer AC, former Minister for Foreign Affairs, former leader of the Liberal Party, and High Commissioner to the United Kingdom
John Howard OM AC SSI, 25th Prime Minister of Australia

For Nadia Clancy (Labor):

EMILY's List Australia
GetUp!

For Stef Rozitis (Greens):

 GetUp!

Division of Grey 
For Rowan Ramsey (Liberal):

For Karin Bolton (Labor):

 EMILY's List Australia

Division of Mayo

For Rebekha Sharkie (Centre Alliance):

Mike Cannon-Brookes, billionaire co-founder and co-CEO of Atlassian
GetUp!
Margo Kingston, journalist, author and commentator

For Georgina Downer (Liberal):

 Alexander Downer AC, former Minister for Foreign Affairs, former leader of the Liberal Party, High Commissioner to the United Kingdom, and father of Georgina

For Anne Bourne (Greens):

 GetUp!

For Saskia Gerhardy (Labor):

 GetUp!

Division of Sturt 
For James Stevens:

 Carolyn Hewson AO, businesswoman and director of BHP
 Christopher Pyne, former Minister for Defence, Minister for Defence Industry, Leader of the House, Minister for Industry, Science and Innovation, Minister for Education and Training, Minister for Ageing, Member for Sturt (1993-2019)
 Amanda Vanstone AO, former Minister for Immigration and Multicultural Affairs, Minister for Family and Community Services, Minister for Justice, Minister for Education, Minister for Employment, Senator for South Australia and Ambassador to Italy

Tasmanian Electorates

Division of Bass 
For Bridget Archer (Liberal):

For Ross Hart (Labor):

For Todd Lambert (Recreational Fishers):

 Construction, Forestry, Maritime, Mining and Energy Union (CFMMEU)

Division of Braddon 
For Justine Keay (Labor):

 EMILY's List Australia

For Gavin Pearce (Liberal):

For Brett Smith (Independent):

 Construction, Forestry, Maritime, Mining and Energy Union (CFMMEU)

Division of Clark

For Andrew Wilkie (Independent)

GetUp!
Margo Kingston, journalist, author and commentator

For Ben McGregor (Labor)

 GetUp!

For Juniper Shaw (Greens)

 GetUp!

Division of Lyons 
For Brian Mitchell (Labor):

For Jessica Whelan (Liberal):

For Deanna Hutchison (National):

Division of Franklin 
For Julie Collins (Labor):

 EMILY's List Australia

Senate candidates

Australian Capital Territory

For the Liberal Party of Australia (A.C.T. Division)

 Adani Group - donated to both Pauline Hanson's One Nation and the Liberal Party of Australia (A.C.T. Division)

For Katy Gallagher (Labor):

 GetUp!

For Alicia Payne (Labor):

 EMILY's List Australia

For Nancy Waites (Labor):

 EMILY's List Australia

For Penny Kyburz (Greens)

 GetUp!

For Anthony Pesec (Independent):

Mike Cannon-Brookes, billionaire co-founder and co-CEO of Atlassian
Margo Kingston, journalist, author and commentator
GetUp!
Alex Turnbull, fund manager and son of the 29th Prime Minister of Australia Malcolm Turnbull

New South Wales

For the Liberal Party of Australia (New South Wales Division)

 Brook Adcock, chairman of Adcock Private Equity
 Companion Systems
 Michael Crouch AC, industrialist, philanthropist and Chairman of Australian private company Midgeon Holdings
 Evans Dixon Limited
 NIB Health Funds
 Pacific Blue Capital

For the Australian Labor Party (New South Wales Branch):

Australian Rail, Tram and Bus Industry Union (RTBU)
GetUp!

For the Greens New South Wales

 GetUp!

For Jim Molan (Liberal):

Andrew Bolt, Sky News Australia host of The Bolt Report and conservative columnist
Russell Crowe, actor, producer and musician
Bob Fulton, former professional rugby league player, coach and commentator
Peter Hartcher, journalist and the Political and International Editor of the Sydney Morning Herald
Alan Jones, 2GB and Sky News Australia broadcaster
Erin Molan, Nine Network sports presenter and daughter of Jim Molan

For Simonne Pengelly (Labor):

 EMILY's List Australia

For Rod Bower (Independents for Climate Action Now)

Mike Cannon-Brookes, billionaire co-founder and co-CEO of Atlassian
Margo Kingston, journalist, author and commentator

Northern Territory 
For Malarndirri McCarthy (Labor):

 EMILY's List Australia

For Sam McMahon (Country Liberal):

Queensland 
For the Liberal National Party of Queensland

 Brian Flannery, billionaire investor, and owner of Ilwella Pty Ltd
 Paul Darrouzet, businessman
 JJ Richards & Sons
 Lancini Group 
 Pacific Blue Capital
 Mark Stockwell, olympic swimmer, and businessman

For the Australian Labor Party (Queensland Branch):

Australian Rail, Tram and Bus Industry Union (RTBU)
GetUp!
Hawker Britton
Holding Redlich

For the Queensland Greens:

 GetUp!

For Nita Green (Labor):

 EMILY's List Australia

South Australia
For the Australian Labor Party (South Australian Branch):

Balgra Shopping Centre Management
GetUp!

For the Liberal Party of Australia (South Australian Division):

 Cartwheel Resources
 Robert Gerard, businessman and former member of the Reserve Bank of Australia
 Hugh MacLachlan, pastoralist

For the Greens South Australia:

 GetUp!

For Sarah Hanson-Young (Greens):

Jane Caro, social commentator, writer and lecturer
Jason Gillespie, cricket coach and former cricketer
Alex Greenwich, Independent Member for Sydney in the New South Wales Legislative Assembly, and LGBTQI+ rights activist
John Hewson, former Leader of the Liberal Party, and former Leader of the Opposition

For Centre Alliance:

 GetUp!

For Emily Gore (Labor):

 EMILY's List Australia

For Larissa Harrison (Labor):

 EMILY's List Australia

Tasmania 
For the Australian Labor Party (Tasmanian Branch):

Australian Rail, Tram and Bus Industry Union (RTBU)
Australian Workers Union (AWU)
Construction, Forestry, Maritime, Mining and Energy Union (CFMMEU)
GetUp!
Kalis Hospitality

For the Tasmanian Greens:

 GetUp!

Victoria
For the Australian Labor Party (Victorian Branch):

Corrs Chambers Westgarth
GetUp!
Hawker Britton
Holding Redlich

For Kimberley Kitching (Labor):

 Bob Maguire, Roman Catholic priest, community worker and media personality

For Jess Walsh (Labor):

 EMILY's List Australia

For Karen Douglas (Labor):

 EMILY's List Australia

For Louise Crawford (Labor):

 EMILY's List Australia

For the Liberal Party of Australia (Victorian Division):

 Bensons Property Group
 Consolidated Travel Group
 Evans Dixon Limited
 Phil Munday, team principal of 23Red Racing
 Riverlee Corporation
 Paul Wheelton, businessman, founder of The Wheelton Group, and philanthropist

For the Australian Greens - Victoria:

GetUp!

For Derryn Hinch's Justice Party:

GetUp!

Western Australia
For the Liberal Party of Australia (Western Australian Division)

Michael Crouch AC, industrialist, philanthropist and Chairman of Australian private company Midgeon Holdings
Helicopter Film Services
Master Builders Association of Western Australia
Stan Perron AC, billionaire businessman, founder of the Perron Group (deceased)

For the Australian Labor Party (Western Australian Branch):

 GetUp!
Hawker Britton

For the Greens Western Australia

 GetUp!

For Anne Aly (Labor):

 EMILY's List Australia

For Louise Pratt (Labor):

 EMILY's List Australia

References 

Political endorsements
2019 Australian federal election